Vices and Virtues or variants may refer to:

 Vices & Virtues (Panic! at the Disco album), 2011
 Vices and Virtues (Art of Dying album), 2011